The Road Construction Authority was a government authority responsible for the construction and maintenance of main roads in the state of Victoria, Australia between 1983 and 1989.

History
The Road Construction Authority (RCB) was formed to take over responsibility from the Country Roads Board for the care and management of the 24,000 kilometres of main roads of the state. The Age observed that the Cain government's formation of the RCA was part of a "radical reorganisation" of the state's transport bureaucracy, reducing the long-standing autonomy of public sector bodies and bringing them closer to ministerial control.

The RBC was abolished on 30 June 1989 when it and the Road Traffic Authority merged to form VicRoads.

Publication
Roads, Victoria was the in house magazine of the RCB.

References

Former government agencies of Victoria (Australia)
Government agencies established in 1983
Government agencies disestablished in 1989
History of transport in Victoria (Australia)
1983 establishments in Australia
1989 disestablishments in Australia